Thomas Burton may refer to:

Politicians
 Thomas Burton (16th century MP) for City of York
 Thomas de Burton, MP for Rutland 1377, 1380
 Thomas Burton (died 1438) (c. 1369–1438), MP for Rutland 1420,1425 and 1427
 Thomas Burton (MP for Westmorland) (died 1661), British Member of Parliament for Westmorland, 1656–1659
 Thomas Burton Hanly (1812–1880), Confederate politician

Sports
 Tommie Burton (1878–1946), West Indian cricketer
 Tom Burton (1964–2010), American professional wrestler
 Tom Burton (sailor) (born 1990), Australian sailor

Others
 Thomas Burton (merchant) (died 1495), Loughborough, England wool merchant
 Thomas Burton (bishop) (died 1458), pre-Reformation bishop of Sodor and Man
 Thomas Burton, a pseudonym used by musician CeeLo Green in the film Mystery Men
 T. L. Burton (born 1944), professor of medieval English literature
 Stephen Longstreet (1907–2002), American author who also wrote as Thomas Burton
 Thomas Burton Adams Jr. (1917–2006), commonly known as Tom Burton
 Thomas G. Burton (born 1935), American professor and specialist in Appalachian folk culture

See also
Burton baronets, several of whom were called Thomas Burton
Burton (name)